Erythrobacter colymbi is a bacterium from the genus Erythrobacter which has been isolated from water from a swimming pool in Tokyo in Japan.

References 

Sphingomonadales
Bacteria described in 2013